Kryptonians are a fictional extraterrestrial race within the DC Comics universe that originated on the planet Krypton. The term originated from the stories of DC Comics superhero, Superman. The stories also use "Kryptonian" as an adjective to refer to anything created by or associated with the planet itself or the cultures that existed on it.

Members of the dominant species of the planet Krypton are indistinguishable from Terran humans in terms of their appearance in their physiology and genetics, but they are vastly different. In some continuities Kryptonians are difficult to clone because their DNA is so complex that human science is not advanced enough to decipher it. The cellular structure of Kryptonians allows for solar energy to be absorbed at extremely high levels. On the planet Krypton, whose parent star has often been depicted as an ancient red supergiant with a relatively low energy output, their natural abilities were the same as humans. When exposed to a young yellow star like Earth's Sun, which is much smaller than their own sun and with a vastly higher energy output, their bodies are able to absorb and process so much energy that it manifests as vast superhuman powers (such as superhuman strength, superhuman speed, invulnerability, flight, x-ray vision, heat vision and superhuman senses).

Almost all Kryptonians were killed when the planet exploded shortly after the infant Kal-El was sent to Earth. In some continuities, he is the planet's only survivor. In other versions of canon, there is a last daughter of Krypton Kara Zor-El. She is a cousin of Superman and known as Supergirl. Krypto was the family dog in Jor-El's home and was used for a test flight of the rocket that ultimately brought baby Kal-El to Earth. These three were the surviving Kryptonians, who became Earth's heroes.

Physiology and powers
Kal-El can lead an alter ego as Clark Kent because Kryptonians appear identical to humans. Also, in both Silver Age and Modern Age continuity, Kryptonians have more than one ethnic group, such as dark-skinned Kryptonians from Krypton's Vathlo Island that resemble Earth humans of Sub-Saharan African, Negrito, Melanesian, and Indigenous Australian descent – reminiscent of Earth peoples of the Negroid, Capoid, and Australoid races – and a group from the continent of Twenx that resemble Earth humans of North African, Middle Eastern, Asian, Micronesian, Polynesian, Native American, and Latino descent – reminiscent of Earth peoples of the non-European Caucasoid and Mongoloid races. This is all due to convergent evolution. In the first stories about Superman's origins, all Kryptonians possess on their homeworld the same powers Superman has on Earth. In later depictions, their abilities are attributed to the differences between Earth's gravity and that of Krypton and the different radiation of the stars they orbit. Kryptonians use solar energy from yellow, blue, orange or white stars on the cellular and molecular levels to gain superhuman abilities. The light of dwarf stars, pulsars, and quasars also grants Kryptonians different abilities. Some stories also maintain that Kryptonians have bioelectric fields that surround their bodies and protect them from harm and which are the means by which Kryptonians fly. Certain individuals (including Conner Kent, Chris Kent, and some Phantom Zone criminals) have sometimes been depicted with "tactile telekinesis" which allows Kryptonians to lift and manipulate large objects whose own structural strength might not otherwise survive the process. The abilities of Kryptonians evolve and grow more powerful as Kryptonians age and develop.

In some continuities, mating between Kryptonians and other species is difficult because Kryptonian DNA is so complex as to be nearly incompatible with that of other species. The only notable exception is represented by the original native Daxamite population (the race that bore that name before intermingling with the Kryptonian explorers, who later adapted the name for themselves). Breeding between Kryptonian explorers and this race created a new Kryptonian hybrid race that could interbreed with a larger number of humanoid races—including Earth humans. No other races are yet known to exhibit the same degree of compatibility of the native Daxamites. However, in some continuations humans are not only able to reproduce with Kryptonians, but are able to create fertile offspring with them.

Superpowered Kryptonians are vulnerable to kryptonite, radioactive remnants of Krypton, magic and solar radiation from red and orange suns.
They are also vulnerable to physical attacks from beings native to Krypton essentially in proportion to their vulnerability in non-powered situations. In addition Kryptonian beings are vulnerable to infection from viruses or bacteria native to Krypton.

Culture and technology

Comics
Kryptonians are a highly culturally and technologically advanced people. Self-grown crystals, both natural and synthetic, which covered the vast majority of their planet's surface gave their homeworld a bluish hue when viewed from space and underlay Kryptonian technology. Relatively small crystals can hold vast amounts of information. The Fortress of Solitude is often portrayed as a recreation of Krypton's surface and a storehouse for all the knowledge that the Kryptonian race had obtained.

A pictographic crest or symbol represents each Kryptonian family, or House; the head of the House usually wears it. According to the Superman movie and sequels, a shape similar to the Latin letter "S" represents the House of El, for example. Superman wears this same symbol on his costume, which therefore serves a dual purpose: it displays his Kryptonian heritage, as well as functioning as the "S" for Superman. Male Kryptonians are identified by hyphenated names, which identify both them and their houses, such as "Jor-El" and "Kal-El" (of the House of El). Female Kryptonians have one given name but take their father's name as their last name. For example, Kal-El's mother is named Lara Lor-Van, taken from her father's name (Lor-Van).

The different Houses were also broken up into a loosely-based caste system as well. The Religious, Artist, Military and Science castes had representation on the ruling council, while the Worker caste did not. The different castes lived in buildings with different architectural styles that represented various styles throughout Krypton's history.

The severe xenophobia of Kryptonian society conveniently explains Kal-El's being the first Kryptonian to leave the planet. Non-superpowered Kryptonians are genetically dependent to their home planet; as such, Kal-El was sent to Earth as a newly conceived embryo within a birthing matrix in order to survive in Earth's atmosphere. He was also devoid of any Kryptonian minerals, because any such minerals would turn to kryptonite upon leaving Krypton's atmosphere. Kryptonians are evolutionarily related to the also-severely xenophobic Daxamites. The Daxamites remain that way up through the 31st century.

Kryptonian law did not believe in capital punishment. Instead, the worst criminals were sent to the Phantom Zone, despite a lack of understanding of the nature of the zone, its danger to the imprisoned and the presence of exits.

Krypton's red sun was named Rao. It was worshiped by the Kryptonians as a deity (albeit in a more scientific and rational way as the giver and sustainer of all life on the planet). Other deities include Nightwing and Flamebird, dragon-like deities who have inspired a number of superhero teams as well as notable dynasties of Krypton e.g., the House of El.

While many Kryptonians wear brightly colored clothes on a daily basis, formal occasions such as funerals and certain council meetings require everyone to wear white. The white formal clothes are often luminescent. It is also seen as a sad, scary, ghostly, faded colour as is depicted in many similar cultures around the world on Earth.

Just like humans domesticating their animals on Earth, Kryptonians also domesticate their own animals as well; which some of them look very similar to Earth's animals, due to parallel evolution, e.g., birds, felids, canids, simians, etc., as seen in Krypto, and Beppo; while others look very different, due to divergent evolution, e.g., fish/snake/eel-like hybrid creatures called "fish-snakes", goat-like creatures called "Zuurt", bovine-like creatures called "Rondor", rhino/ceratopsian-like hybrid creatures called "Thought-Beasts", and dragon-like creatures called "H'Raka".

Television
The Kryptonian society, as described in Lois and Clark: The New Adventures of Superman (at least, according to what was seen of its surviving colony) is ruled by aristocracy. Arranged marriages between the members of nobility are common, sometimes as early as birth (as was revealed to be the case with Kal-El), and numerous concubines are allowed. Settling of noble disputes by private duels is fully legal (although highly uncommon) and apparently gives advantages in terms of reputation. Criminals are punished for capital crimes by having their bodies dispersed across the universe (the process is reversible, at least until a certain stage). All Kryptonians are capable of long range telepathic communication. The society is highly pragmatic and the Kryptonians seen were surprised and displeased with Clark's unwillingness to kill. Unlike in the comics, the main clothing color seen is black.

In Supergirl, some of the elements, like their black clothing and telepathy, was retained except that the shields featured a different letter, indicating a different House other than Zor-El's. This shield is worn on the right shoulder. Like in Smallville, a number of criminals imprisoned by the Kryptonians in the Phantom Zone are from other planets and have different powers from those of either Superman or Supergirl.

Language and alphabet

Comics
For most of Superman's published history, Kryptonian writing was represented by random, alien-looking squiggles. In the 1970s, E. Nelson Bridwell attempted to rationalize these squiggles into a 118-letter alphabet, referring to the language as "Kryptonese". This standardized alphabet was then used by DC Comics until John Byrne's 1986 "reboot" of the Superman universe.

In 2000, DC introduced a transliteration alphabet for the written language, dropping the "Kryptonese" moniker in favor of the more commonly assumed "Kryptonian." All such writing appearing in the comic books is actually just the language of publication (English in the US and UK, French in France, etc.) written using this transliteration alphabet to replace the native alphabet with a one-to-one correspondence, in a similar fashion to Interlac in Legion of Super-Heroes.

Smallville
On the television series Smallville, depictions of the written Kryptonian language began, primarily, with English transliterated into the official Kryptonian transliteration font – mirroring the practice of the comics. The style of these depictions has since evolved over the life of the series from decipherable transliterated writing to a more stylized (and indiscernible) form. In the process, an increasing amount of logographic components have been added with symbols that have been explained to represent words, ideas, or names.

In the episode "Gemini", a character muttering in an unconscious state is revealed to be speaking Kryptonian.

Superman/Batman: Apocalypse
In the Superman/Batman: Apocalypse movie, a mix of gibberish and Esperanto is used to depict Kryptonian dialogue spoken by both Superman and Supergirl.

Man of Steel
The 2013 film Man of Steel featured Kryptonian writing created by graphic designer Kirsten Franson. The mechanics of the writing system (an abugida), as well as the Kryptonian language that it depicts (which was not spoken in the film), were created by Dr. Christine Schreyer, a linguistic anthropologist and assistant professor of anthropology working at the University of British Columbia, Okanagan. The writing can be seen in several places on Superman's suit in the subsequent films Batman v Superman: Dawn of Justice (2016) and Justice League (2017).

Arrowverse
On the Arrowverse television series Supergirl the official Kryptonian transliteration font is used for depictions of the Kryptonian language in various scenes throughout the series. In season 3, episodes 2, 6, 7, 13, 20, and 22 and season 5 episode 10 featured a few short lines of Kryptonian dialogue using the language created by Darren Doyle, citing the first time a constructed Kryptonian language (as opposed to gibberish) has been spoken in any official media.

The 2021 television series Superman & Lois featured characters speaking the Doyle version of Kryptonian in the season 1 episodes Man of Steel, Loyal Subjekts, and O Mother, Where Art Thou?. Doyle is credited in Through the Valley of Death, but no Kryptonian was used.

Calendar

Comics
In the 1970s and 1980s, details about the Kryptonian calendar as it existed in the Earth-One universe were revealed.  The Kryptonian time units were defined as follows:

 100 thribo (Kryptonian seconds) per dendar (Kryptonian minute).
 100 dendaro (Kryptonian minutes) per wolu (Kryptonian hour).
 10 woluo (Kryptonian hours) per zetyar (Kryptonian day).
 six zetyaro (Kryptonian days) per fanff (Kryptonian week).
 73 zetyaro (Kryptonian days) per lorax (Kryptonian month).
 438 zetyaro (Kryptonian days) per amzet (Kryptonian year).
 73 fanffo (Kryptonian weeks) per amzet (Kryptonian year).
 six loraxo (Kryptonian months) per amzet (Kryptonian year).
 The six loraxo (months) were: Belyuth, Ogtal, Ullhah, Eorx, Hefralt and Norzec.

(Note: In the Kryptonian language, the suffix "o" indicates the plural form of a noun.)

According to one story, in which the Phantom Zone prisoner Quex-Ul had served his full sentence, 18 Kryptonian sun-cycles (amzeto) is about 25 Earth years.  It can be demonstrated that one Kryptonian sun-cycle is approximately 1.37 Earth years, as follows:

 Superman was born on 35 Eorx 9998, which occurred on February 29 in the Earth calendar.
 Krypton exploded early on 39 Ogtal 10000, which occurred on June 16 in the Earth calendar (Superman arrived on Earth two days later, on June 18).
 Therefore, there were 734 Kryptonian days (1.676 Kryptonian years) between the two events.
 Since 18 Kryptonian years is about 25 Earth years, then there were approximately 2.3 Earth years between the two events.
 The exact number of days between February 29, and June 16 two years later, is 838 (or 2.294 years).
 Thus, 1.676 Kryptonian years equals 2.294 Earth years, or 1 Kryptonian year equals roughly 1.37 Earth years.

Using this ratio of 1.37 Earth years per Kryptonian year (amzet), and ignoring any potential Kryptonian leap day and any differences in time of day, one can approximate other units of time:

 1.37 years per amzet
 0.99 seconds per thrib (31,556,952 seconds/year * 1.37 years/amzet * one amzet/43,800,000 thrib)
 1.65 minutes per dendar (525949.2 minutes/year * 1.37 years/amzet * one amzet/438,000 dendar)
 2.74 hours per wolu (8765.82 hours/year * 1.37 years/amzet * one amzet/4,380 wolu)
 1.14 days per zetyar (365.2425 days/year * 1.37 years/amzet * one amzet/438 zetyar)

Major events in the Kryptonian calendar include:
 Jor-El and Lara were married on 47 Ullhah 9997.
 The city of Kandor was stolen by Brainiac on 33 Ogtal 9998.
 Kal-El (Superman) was born to Jor-El and Lara on 35 Eorx 9998.
 The Phantom Zone became an official method of punishment, and Jax-Ur became its first prisoner, on 67 Eorx 9999.
 Kal-El's pet dog, Krypto the Superdog, was lost in space on 54 Belyuth 10000.
 Jor-El launched the Phantom Zone projector into space on 30 Ogtal 10000.
 Lar Gand of Daxam landed on Krypton and met Jor-El on 34 Ogtal 10000.
 Kal-El was sent in an interstellar rocketship towards Earth and Krypton exploded on 39 Ogtal 10000.

Survivors

Comics
When Krypton was destroyed, it was thought that the entire Kryptonian race was destroyed. This was untrue – the scientist Jor-El managed to send his newborn son, Kal-El, off-planet to Earth right before Krypton's demise. Kal-El grew up on Earth as Clark Kent and eventually discovered his Kryptonian origins. Superman's cousin Supergirl also survived Krypton's destruction, as did Kristin Wells, who had been on the run in space at the time of the planet's destruction. Kryptonian survivors of alternate worlds, such as Power Girl (Kara Zor-L), the dog Krypto the Superdog, and the monkey Beppo the Super-Monkey, also reside on Earth. Kryptonians General Zod and Ursa are among the many criminals had been imprisoned within the Phantom Zone prior to Krypton's destruction and even went on to have a child, who would later be adopted as Christopher Kent. Jor-El's delinquent neighbor, Dev-Em believed his warnings enough to build a shelter that survived the destruction of Krypton and was propelled through space. Eradicator, a robot built by the Kryptonian council, departed the planet with a group of colonists, survived their decimation, and would later encounter Superman.

The Kryptonian city Kandor was also spared from destruction, as it was shrunken and collected by Brainiac. Kryptonian people live there in standard but microscopic, non-superpowered lives. Also, the inhabitants of the planet Daxam are descendants of Kryptonians who long ago ventured into space and settled on another planet. As such they possess similar powers and abilities to traditional Kryptonians when exposed to a yellow sun. The people of Argo City also survive Krypton's destruction due to an enemy field surrounding the city, although in most universes the city either dies out soon afterward or is captured and immersed into Kandor by Brainiac. 

The monster Doomsday is the last of the prehistoric Kryptonians.

On Earth-Two, the Kryptonian Val-Zod (Superman) survive Krypton, along with Kara Zor-L/Karen Starr (Supergirl).

The New 52 introduces a survivor named H'El, a Kryptonian clone who piloted a prototype of the rocket Jor-El uses to save his son and departed Krypton with the planet's historical records.

Film
In Superman, teenage Clark discovers who he is in the Fortress of Solitude, where a hologram of Jor-El tells him, "You are the only survivor of the planet Krypton." This remark appears to prove untrue in Superman II, as prisoners of the Phantom Zone, such as General Zod, also survive the destruction of Krypton. However, Zod and his lieutenants only survived because they were at that time incarcerated within the Phantom Zone and were not in fact on Krypton at the time of its destruction. The film Supergirl shows inhabitants of Argo City who also survived by fleeing to a parallel dimension, including Superman's cousin Supergirl. In Superman Returns, it is revealed that Clark is father to the half-Kryptonian child Jason White.

In Man of Steel, Kryptonians are depicted as a genetically-engineered race of beings. They are artificially grown in "genesis chambers" using information from the Codex, a skull containing the entire genetic code of the Kryptonian race. With this method, Kryptonians are designated pre-determined roles in society at their conception – for example, Jor-El is a Scientist, whereas General Zod is a Warrior.  In ancient times, they were a race in the midst of an era of expansion, travelling to other worlds via scout ships in order to colonize them. Kal-El is the first (and technically, last) naturally-born Kryptonian in centuries, as Jor-El and Lara believed that Krypton had lost the freedom of choice and wanted their son to choose to become who he wanted to be. As in the comics, Kal-El's powers are depicted as being superior to other Kryptonians, due to his spending a far greater period of time exposed to Earth's yellow sun and atmosphere, though some have an advantage over him in terms of combat experience (e.g. Zod, Faora and Nam-Ek). While the other Kryptonians receive great strength and speed from Earth's sun, they require solar-suits to regulate the radiation and avoid being stricken by pain. In addition, it is shown that without some form of training, Kryptonians are left vulnerable to their own abilities, as the case with Zod when Superman destroyed his solar-visor and caused him to develop a sensory overload.

In the animated film Superman: Unbound Brainiac abducted and shrunk the people of both Kandor and Argo City from Krypton. They are eventually rescued and restored to normal size by Superman and Supergirl, who were sent to Earth in rockets as in other versions of the story.

The animated adaptation of All-Star Superman features the inhabitants of Kandor, and a pair of surviving Kryptonian astronauts named Bar-El and Lilo. The Phantom Zone also makes an appearance, implying that prisoners inside it survived Krypton's destruction like in so many other continuities. The ending reveals that Lois Lane will be artificially inseminated with Superman's child and that their descendants will remain super-power heroes centuries into the future.

In Superman: Man of Tomorrow the bounty hunter Lobo claims that Superman is the only survivor of Krypton's destruction. However, he later admits this was a ploy to negotiate a higher bounty on Superman and there are probably other surviving Kryptonians.

Television
In Lois & Clark: The New Adventures of Superman, it was shown that a sizable Kryptonian colony (called New Krypton) has survived the destruction of the planet. Clark had to go to the colony as its official ruler, but returned to Earth soon after.

In Smallville, Clark Kent initially believes himself to be the last survivor of Krypton. However, his father Jor-El's memories remains sentient in the mysterious Kawatche Caves and Fortress of Solitude an disembodied AI, and the disembodied spirit of Zod is similarly sentient albeit trapped in the Phantom Zone. In Season Five, Clark discovers that the Disciples of Zod: Nam-Ek & Aethyr and a Kryptonian artificial intelligence: Brain-Interactive-Construct aka Brainiac arrive on Earth, serving Zod's trapped spirit. In Season Six, Clark discovers his father's assistant Raya was spared by being placed in the Phantom Zone, with her body intact. She helped Clark on Earth until her death a short time after her escape from the Phantom Zone. Season Seven introduces Kara Zor-El, having been sent to Earth at the same time of Clark but trapped in suspended animation since then; later, through schemes put into practice before his death, Clark's uncle Zor-El and mother Lara are resurrected with powers intact for a time. Later, it is revealed that another Kryptonian, the scientist Dax-Ur, has been living on Earth for over a hundred years, using blue kryptonite to render himself powerless, and has even fathered a son with his human wife. Dax-Ur is killed soon after by Brainiac. In Season 8, it is revealed that Zod's wife Faora, also a disembodied wraith, was sent into the Phantom Zone with her husband, but not before they genetically engineered their son, fusing genetic material taken from the most violent Kryptonian life-forms with their own. The child was attached to Clark's ship in the form of a cocoon; on Earth it assumed a human form and became known as Davis Bloome, but would periodically assume its true form: the monster Doomsday. In the season finale, Zod makes his first full bodied appearance on the series, along with a large number of other Kryptonians who are later revealed to be clones created as part of an old experiment. Initially powerless due to their cells having been treated with blue kryptonite radiation, these clones later gain powers when Clark is forced to provide Zod with a sample of his blood to heal him after he is shot, Zod using this blood to empower his followers. The clones are relocated to a new world that they designate 'New Krypton' at the conclusion of Season Nine, with Clark Kent remaining on Earth and Zod being sent to the Phantom Zone to merge with his original self when the clones learn that Zod killed his lover Faora for objecting to his plans. Kara also mentions a rumor that Kandor survived the destruction of their home planet but it is never revealed whether this is true.

In Superman: The Animated Series and later Justice League Unlimited, the only survivors of Krypton are Clark and two Phantom Zone criminals (Jax-Ur and Mala, introduced in "Blasts From the Past", parts 1 and 2). Kara In-Zee, alias Supergirl, is the lone survivor of Argos, Krypton's sister planet knocked out by the planet's explosion; however, in the Justice League Unlimited episode "Fearful Symmetry", Doctor Emil Hamilton, who has examined Superman, calls her DNA "Kryptonian", indicating that Argosians are genetically related to Kryptonians. Failed clones of Superman (the mentally handicapped Bizarro and the monstrous Doomsday) and Supergirl (the sociopathic Galatea) are later created.

In Legion of Super Heroes, the citizens of Kandor, Superman and his clone Superman-X, might all be considered surviving Kryptonians. The Phantom Zone also appears in one episode. While it isn't explicitly stated that its prisoners are Kryptonian by birth, one resembles General Zod, and another has powers similar to Superman.

In the Super Friends Kandor appears inside Superman's Fortress of Solitude in one episode and several of its miniaturized (yet still super-powered) inhabitants provide aid to the titular group of heroes. Two episodes also feature a trio of Phantom Zone prisoners. 

In Justice League Action Superman, Krypto, the Phantom Zone prisoners, Supergirl (whether she came to Earth in Kandor, directly from Krypton, or from Ago City is never revealed), the people of Kandor, and Streaky the Supercat at all survivors of Krypton. After Kandor is rescued from Brainiac, attempts are made to re-enlarge the city and its people, but it is unconfirmed whether they succeed. General Zod, Faora, and Quex-Ul are implied to be the only three prisoners of the Phantom Zone.

Krypton has the events that trigger Krypton's destruction being stopped by a time-traveler, something which is never undone before the show's cancellation, allowing the planet's whole population to survive what would have destroyed them. Even before the timeline changed, Brainiac would have taken Kandor and its people.

In the Arrowverse TV series Supergirl, another Kryptonian House was revealed, this one led by Alura Zor-El's twin sister, General Astra. Her shield featured a "Q" on her uniform, indicating that besides her niece Kara, she and her house survived the destruction of Krypton, along with the Kryptonian prisoners sentenced by Alura (and who are working under Astra) that crash-landed on Earth via the prison ship Fort Rozz. One of Astra's operatives, Vartox, was ordered to sabotage the Department of Extra-Normal Operations by causing a plane crash that was thwarted by Supergirl (when she realized her sister Alex Danvers, a DEO member, was on board), and to alert Astra that Kara survived the explosion and now has come into discovering her powers. In "Hostile Takeover" more Kryptonians, led by Astra's husband Non, surfaced on Earth preparing for take over of the planet, and came prepared to counter the kryptonite weapons with anti-kryptonite body armor. The third season reveals that Alura and the populace of Argo City survived Krypton's destruction due to Alura's husband Zor-El's energy shield. Argo City is destroyed during the Crisis on Infinite Earths, but is resurrected following the Anti-Monitor's defeat. The show's final season reveals that Zor-El (who was unable to be at Argo City during Krypton's destruction) also survived by sending himself to the Phantom Zone as his planet was destroyed.

In the world of Superman & Lois (which takes place on an unnamed Earth that is different from Prime-Earth), Superman's older maternal half-brother Tal-Rho (operating with the alias of Morgan Edge) was also sent to Earth by his father Zeta-Rho in an evacuation rocket but became embittered by his negative first contacts with humanity and became a villain. Tal-Rho comes into possession of a Kryptonian invention called the Eradicator which survived the planet's destruction and contains the consciousnesses of many Kryptonians like Lara Lor-Van and General Zod. Under the guidance of Zeta-Rho's A.I. and with the aid of Dabney Donovan, Tal-Rho used the Eradicator combined with X-Kryptonite to give those survivors physical bodies by having them possess inhabitants of Earth like inhabitants of Smallville like he did with his personal assistant Irma Sayres (who used the alias of Leslie Larr), his one-time minion David Fuglestad, and a select number of Smallville inhabitants.

In Young Justice, it was believed Superman (Kal-El) was the sole survivor of Krypton’s destruction by its exploding star Rao with exceptions being his half-Kryptonian, half-human clone Superboy and his son with Lois Lane Jonathan. However in the fourth season Young Justice: Phantoms, after Superboy gets accidentally transported to an unknown dimension after being presumed dead after an explosion on Mars, Superboy meets General Dru-Zod and his followers Ursa Zod, Faora Hu-Ul, Non, Kru-El, Jax-Ur, and Vor-Kil and learns that he is in the Phantom Zone. Towards the end of the season, after Dru and Ursa’s son from the future Lor-Zod frees them from the zone, they try to conquer Earth with their Kryptonian allies but fail and most are sent back to the Phantom Zone except Ursa who was saved by the Eye of Ekron and taken to Daxam and Lor-Zod who was killed. The Light has Klarion hunt down all the Kryptonians in the zone and has the dozens of them in stasis aboard The Warworld with Apokolips acquiring Kara Zor-El as a member of their army.

Video games
In the One Earth Regime universe featured in Injustice: Gods Among Us and Injustice 2, Krypton is attacked by the rogue Coluan scientist Brainiac. The Kryptonians find themselves at the mercy of Brainiac's forces and Kara Zor-El barely escapes the destruction of Argo City. Her mother Alura rescues her from Brainiac's drones and reveals she and Jor-El have both been working to create two ships, one for Kara and the other for her baby cousin Kal-El. Kara and Kal-El escape Krypton as it is destroyed by Brainiac, though Kara's ship is damaged by the explosion knocking it off course and putting Kara into hyper sleep. Kal-El is raised on Earth as Clark Kent and becomes Superman. As Superman he forms the Justice League and befriends Batman. However, the Joker ends up tricking Superman into attacking Lois Lane, who was pregnant with Superman's child. This results in her death which triggers a nuclear explosion that destroys Metropolis. Superman murders the Joker and establishes a tyrannical government called the One Earth Regime. However, Batman, opposed to Superman's methods, forms the Insurgency to overthrow the Regime. With the aid of the Justice League from another universe, the Regime is defeated and the Insurgency works to rebuild. However, Superman's ally, Black Adam, finds Kara's ship and brings her to Earth. 

Together they free Superman's current lover Wonder Woman from imprisonment on Themyscira. Wonder Woman and Black Adam hide the tyrannical nature of the Regime from Supergirl and train her to use her powers in secret, though Brainiac attacks Earth after being alerted to Kal-El's survival due to his Regime's supporting the Sinestro Corps. in a war with the Green Lantern Corps. Supergirl and the Regime try to break Superman out of prison, but are stopped by Batman and his allies, though Batman decides to release Superman, calling a temporary truce between the Regime and the Insurgency to combat Brainiac. During Brainiac's attack on Metropolis, Supergirl witnesses Wonder Woman's brutal attack on their ally Harley Quinn after Harley tried to stop Wonder Woman from killing the Cheetah, as it violated Batman's no-killing policy. Supergirl saves Harley's life and confronts her cousin at the Fortress of Solitude. Supergirl is horrified to learn her cousin approves of Wonder Woman's actions, though he believes it would be best to deal with Harley after Brainiac is dealt with. Supergirl compares his methods to General Zod's and briefly fights Superman and his allies, though Brainiac's attack forces them to focus on dealing with him first. Superman and Supergirl work together to attack Brainiac's ship, but are stopped by its barrier. Brainiac destroys Metropolis reminding Superman of his past failure, causing him to attack the ship with all his might, only to be seemingly killed by Brainiac. Batman confronts the grieving Supergirl and reveals that Superman was once his friend. Believing Kara is the last surviving Kryptonian, Brainiac offers to spare Earth if they hand over Kara Zor-El as he wishes to study the effects of yellow sun radiation on Kryptonian cells, though Batman refuses. Batman, his allies and the remaining Regime members manage to overload the shields protecting Brainiac's ship. Batman and Supergirl manage to infiltrate the ship, but Supergirl is captured, though Batman discovers that Superman is still alive and the two join forces to defeat Brainiac and free Supergirl. 

However, after Brainiac's defeat, Superman and Batman argue over Brainiac's fate, leading to an end to their truce. Despite Brainiac being responsible for Krypton's destruction, Supergirl sides with Batman and choose to spare Brainiac so he can help them restore the worlds and cities he has collected. Supergirl tries to reason with her cousin by telling him of how his father opposed General Zod, only for Superman to reveal he agrees with Zod's methods, believing that if Jor-El had been more like Zod, then he would have been able to save Krypton. In Superman's story mode ending, Batman is defeated, though Superman spares him due to not wanting him to become a martyr. Superman merges with Brainiac's ship and imprisons Supergirl in his former cell. He reveals that all the cities have been restored and Earth is once again under the control of the Regime. Superman reveals there is still a place for her and that he is creating an army using beings freed from Brainiac's collection. Supergirl refuses to join him, though Superman reveals he has used Brainiac's technology to turn Batman into a brainwashed slave and threatens to do the same to Kara if she continues to resist. 

In Batman's story mode ending, Superman is defeated by Batman after Kara leads him to the Batcave. Batman apologizes to Kara for not being able to save her cousin. Superman is taken prisoner and Batman decides to imprison him in the Phantom Zone. Superman vows to escape and is hurt by Supergirl's betrayal. Supergirl reveals to Batman the House of El's S symbol is supposed to be a symbol of hope; though her cousin turned it into a symbol of fear, Batman, however, states that its meaning is determined by the one who wears it and tells her of how he and Superman used to fight for justice as members of the Justice League, before offering her a chance to do the same, having earned Batman's trust. In Supergirl's character ending, she joins Batman's Justice League, working with them to restore Kandor and cities collected by Brainiac. Supergirl notes that while she could not save her cousin, it will not stop her from trying to bring people hope. She is last shown flying with other Kryptonian survivors in the sky of a restored Kryptonian city. In Sub-Zero's ending, Superman joins forces with Kryptonian criminals General Zod, Ursa and Non after escaping the Phantom Zone through a portal accidentally created by the Batman's Justice League while trying to create a portal to Earthrealm. Sub-Zero confronts Superman, while Supergirl faces General Zod, and Batman battles Ursa and Non. In Injustice: Gods Among Us, General Zod appears as a DLC character, though he plays no role in the game's story. In Injustice 2, Power Girl appears as an alternate character skin for Supergirl, though she does not appear in the main story and originates from Earth-2.

Literature
In The Last Days of Krypton by Kevin J. Anderson, young Kal-El and the people of Argo City (along with refugees from another city living there after General Zod destroyed their home) are the only survivors of Krypton's actual destruction. Other Kryptonians not present at the time are the people of Kandor (who were abducted by Brainiac) and Zod and at least two of his minions (who are confined to the recently created Phantom Zone).

See also
 Krypton glossary

References

External links
 
 Kryptonian.info—information about the various incarnations of the Kryptonian language over Superman's history
 E. Nelson Bridwell / Al Turniansky Language (ca. 1950s-1985): History • Alphabet • Font
 DC Comics Font (2000–Present): Information  • Font
 Schreyer Language (2013–Present): Information • Writing System
 Doyle Language (2006–Present): Introduction • Dictionary • Font • Writing Reference Sheet
 Dr. Christine Schreyer's Kryptonian Page—Dr. Schreyer is a linguistic anthropologist hired to create the Kryptonian language depicted in the films Man of Steel (2013), Batman v Superman: Dawn of Justice (2016) and Justice League (2017)

 
Superman
DC Comics alien species
DC Comics characters who can move at superhuman speeds
DC Comics characters with superhuman senses
DC Comics characters with superhuman strength
DC Comics characters with accelerated healing
Fictional extraterrestrial humanoids
Fictional endangered and extinct species
Fictional characters who can duplicate themselves
Fictional characters with slowed ageing
Fictional characters with X-ray vision
Fictional characters with nuclear or radiation abilities
Fictional characters with air or wind abilities
Fictional characters with ice or cold abilities
Fictional characters with absorption or parasitic abilities
Fictional characters with energy-manipulation abilities
Fictional characters with fire or heat abilities
Fictional characters with superhuman durability or invulnerability
Fiction set in the Andromeda Galaxy